Sean McCann may refer to:

 Sean McCann (actor) (1935 – 2019), Canadian television actor
 Séan McCann (musician) (born 1967), Canadian, member of Great Big Sea and Sean McCann & The Committed
 Sean McCann (politician) (born 1971), Michigan State Representative and State Senator-elect
 Sean McCann (soldier) (born 1950), Irish Defence Forces Chief of Staff